Neonetus is a genus of cave wētā in the family Rhaphidophoridae, endemic to New Zealand. All described species are small; when adult, individuals are only about 1 cm long. Neonetus variegatus and N. huttoni are common in native and exotic forests but because they are small and nocturnal, they are often overlooked.

Taxonomy 

The genus Neonetus was established by Brunner von Wattenwyl in 1888.

Biology 

Neonetus are active at night when they are vulnerable to becoming food for rats and kiwi.

Distribution 
Current observational data suggests that Neonetus is restricted to the North Island of New Zealand.

Species 
 Neonetus huttoni Chopard, 1923 
 Neonetus pilosus (Hutton, 1904)
 Talitropsis/Neonetus poduroides (Walker, 1869)
 Neonetus variegatus Brunner, 1888

References 

 Peripatus

Ensifera genera
Cave weta